= Georg Gerle =

Georg Gerle (1520–1591) was a Renaissance luthier specialising in lutes, from Füssen, Germany. He worked in Northern Italy and in Austria. His instruments survive at the Kunsthistorisches Museum, Vienna, Austria.
